"Don't Break My Heart Again" is a song co-written and recorded by American country music artist Pat Green.  It was released in August 2004 as the first single from the album Lucky Ones.  The song reached #21 on the Billboard Hot Country Singles & Tracks chart.  The song was written by Green and Wade Bowen.

Chart performance

References

2004 singles
2004 songs
Pat Green songs
Song recordings produced by Don Gehman
Song recordings produced by Frank Rogers (record producer)
Show Dog-Universal Music singles
Songs written by Pat Green